Catherine de la Tour du Pin (about 1290 - 1337), was the tenth child of Humbert I of Viennois and Anne d'Albon. She married Philip I of Piedmont, with whom she had eleven children, including James of Piedmont.

Notes and references 

1337 deaths
Year of birth uncertain
14th-century French women
Princesses of Piedmont